The Icelandic National Badminton Championships is a tournament organized to crown the best badminton players in Iceland. They are held since 1949.

Past winners

References
Badminton Europe - Details of affiliated national organisations
Badmintonsambands Íslands

Badminton tournaments in Iceland
National badminton championships
Sports competitions in Iceland
Recurring sporting events established in 1949
Badminton